The 2010–11 Conference USA men's basketball season marks the 16th season of Conference USA basketball.

Awards & honors

Conference USA All-Conference teams

References